La Sista (Maidel Amador Canales) is a female reggaeton singer.

From Loíza, Puerto Rico, several members of her family are also musicians. She got a big break at the age of 19 when she appeared on the television programme La Casa Under, and since signed to Machete Music, releasing her debut album in 2006.

Discography 
 Majestad Negroide (2006), Machete Music
 Los RompeCorazones: Teorias Del Amor vol.1 (2007) – Various artists, compilation

Singles
 "Anacaona (2006)
 "Se Desvive Por Ella" (R&B version) feat. Jadiel (2007)
 "Se Desvive Por Ella" (Reggaeton Version) Feat. Jadiel (2007)
 "Se Desvive Por Ella" (Remix) feat. Jadiel, Ivy Queen (2007/08)
 "Dos Amantes, Dos Amigos" feat Mario VI (2008)
 "Callejero" feat. Jay V & Cano (2008)
 "Striper" (2008)
 "Striper" (Remix) feat.Jowell & Randy (2008)
 "Se Le Ve" (2009)
 "Se Le Ve" (Remix) feat.Yomo (2009)
 "Me Faltas Tu" Ft. Juno (2011)

Other Collaborations
 "Dime St Tu Pienses En Mi" (remix) Nicky Jam feat La Zista
 "Te Vi" (On the album Los Mero Mero)
 "Fruty Loop" feat. Tony Lenta

References

Puerto Rican reggaeton musicians
Living people
People from Loíza, Puerto Rico
1985 births
Puerto Rican people of African descent
Women in Latin music